Vanthourenhout is a surname. Notable people with the surname include:

Dieter Vanthourenhout (born 1985), Belgian cyclist
Sven Vanthourenhout (born 1981), Belgian cyclist

Surnames of Belgian origin